Route 333 is a collector road in the Canadian province of Nova Scotia.

It is located in the Halifax Regional Municipality, connecting Upper Tantallon at Trunk 3 with Beechville at Trunk 3.

From Tantallon to Peggy's Cove it is known as the "Peggy's Cove Road".  From West Dover to Beechville it is named the "Prospect Road".  The entire route is part of the Lighthouse Route scenic travel way.

Route description

Communities
Upper Tantallon
Tantallon
Glen Haven
French Village
Seabright
Glen Margaret
Hacketts Cove
Indian Harbour
Peggys Cove
West Dover
Middle Village
Bayside
Shad Bay
Whites Lake
Hatchet Lake
Goodwood
Beechville

Parks
 Long Lake Provincial Park

Other
Peggys Point Lighthouse

History

The entirety of Collector Highway 333 was once designated as Trunk Highway 33. The Trunk 33 designation is now used on the Bedford Bypass as an unsigned highway.

See also
List of Nova Scotia provincial highways
Swissair Memorial

References

Nova Scotia provincial highways
Roads in Halifax, Nova Scotia